Antonis Tsolinas (1908 – 28 February 1956) was a Greek footballer who played for Ethnikos Piraeus and Panathinaikos. He featured three times for the Greece national football team between 1930 and 1931, scoring four goals.

Career statistics

International

International goals
Scores and results list Greece's goal tally first, score column indicates score after each Greece goal.

References

1908 births
1956 deaths
Greece international footballers
Association football forwards
Panathinaikos F.C. players
Footballers from Athens
Greek footballers
Ethnikos Piraeus F.C. players